Featherstone railway station serves the town of Featherstone in West Yorkshire, England.

The current station was opened by West Yorkshire Metro on 12 May 1992 when the line between Wakefield and Pontefract was reopened. A previous station on the same site had been closed in January 1967 when passenger services between Wakefield and Pontefract were withdrawn as a result of the Beeching Axe.

Services
During Monday to Saturday, there are hourly train services to Leeds via Wakefield and to Knottingley via Pontefract Monkhill.  There are now trains on Sundays. These run two-hourly between Knottingley and Leeds via Wakefield.

References

External links

Railway stations in Wakefield
DfT Category F2 stations
Former Lancashire and Yorkshire Railway stations
Railway stations in Great Britain opened in 1848
Railway stations in Great Britain closed in 1967
Reopened railway stations in Great Britain
Railway stations in Great Britain opened in 1992
Northern franchise railway stations
Beeching closures in England
Featherstone